Skeena may refer to:
Skeena River, a river in British Columbia
The Skeenas or Skeena Mountains, a mountain range in British Columbia
Skeena (electoral district), a former federal electoral district in British Columbia
Skeena (provincial electoral district), a provincial electoral district in British Columbia
Jasper – Prince Rupert train, a train service operated by Via Rail formerly known as the Skeena
HMCS Skeena, Canadian Navy ships
Skeena (sternwheeler), a pioneer sternwheeler on the Skeena River

See also
Skeena Country
Skeena—Bulkley Valley, a federal electoral district in British Columbia
Skeena Crossing or Kitseguecla, a village in British Columbia